Rewind is the fourth studio album by the American musician Johnny Rivers, released in 1967 by Imperial Records. The album includes cover versions of "Baby, I Need Your Lovin'" and "The Tracks of My Tears". Produced by Lou Adler with arrangements by Jimmy Webb, who wrote seven of the songs. Noted Los Angeles session musicians The Wrecking Crew provided the music. The album spent 21 weeks on the Billboard albums chart and peaked at #14 . "Tracks of my Tears" spent nine weeks on the Billboard Hot 100 and peaked at #9, while "Baby I Need Your Lovin'" spent eleven weeks and peaked at #3.

Reception
In his review in AllMusic, Zach Curd called Rewind, with its "big, clean production, and quality L.A. session musicians", a "great collection of blue-eyed soul and rock." Curd concluded that the album was "a solid, tight recording, with excellent production and inventive arrangements provided by Webb."

Track listing
All songs written by Jimmy Webb except where noted.

Side one
 "The Tracks of My Tears" (Warren "Pete" Moore, Smokey Robinson, Marvin Tarplin) – 2:53
 "Carpet Man" – 3:02
 "Tunesmith" – 3:10
 "Sidewalk Song / 27th Street" – 2:25
 "It'll Never Happen Again" (Tim Hardin) – 3:25
  "Do What You Gotta Do" – 2:19

Side two
 "Baby I Need Your Lovin'" (Lamont Dozier, Brian Holland, Eddie Holland) – 3:08
 "For Emily, Whenever I May Find Her" (Paul Simon) – 2:47
 "Rosecrans Boulevard" – 2:31
 "The Eleventh Song" – 2:19
 "Sweet Smiling Children" – 2:10

Personnel

Musicians
 Johnny Rivers – vocals, guitar
 The Blossoms – backing vocals
 Larry Knechtel – piano
 Mike Deasy Sr. – guitar
 Joe Osborn – bass guitar
 Hal Blaine – drums
 Mike Deasy Jr. – vocals

Technical
 Lou Adler – producer
  Armin Steiner, Michael Lietz – engineers
 Jimmy Webb – arranger, conductor, liner notes
 Marty Paich – horns and strings arranger/conductor
 Woody Woodward – art direction
 Bernard Yeszin, George Rodriguez, Ivan Nagy – photography

References

External links
 Johnny Rivers official website

1967 albums
Imperial Records albums
Albums arranged by Jimmy Webb
Albums arranged by Marty Paich
Albums produced by Lou Adler
Albums recorded at United Western Recorders
Johnny Rivers albums